The Communist Party of Nepal (Marxist–Leninist) was a political party in Nepal. It was launched in 1978 by the All Nepal Communist Revolutionary Coordination Committee (Marxist–Leninist), which founded by groups involved in the Jhapa movement. The CPN (ML) published Varg-Sangarsh (Class Struggle) and Mukti Morcha (Liberation Front).

History

Revolutionary Coordination Committee 
The All Nepal Communist Revolutionary Coordination Committee (Marxist–Leninist) was founded in 1975 and had been inspired by the Naxalite movement in India led by the Communist Party of India (Marxist–Leninist). It had strong links to the Vinod Mishra faction of CPI (ML) that had a strong presence in the Indian state of Bihar.

The party had its roots in the Jhapa District Committee of the Communist Party of Nepal (Amatya) and the Morang District-based Nepal Revolutionary Organisation (Marxist–Leninist) led by Madhav Kumar Nepal. The party inspired by the Naxalites carried out a peasant-led anti-feudal movement in Jhapa District. On 30 August 1977, Mukti Morcha Samuha led by Madan Kumar Bhandari merged into the party. In August 1978, a section of the Dhanusa District Committee of the Communist Party of Nepal (Amatya) merged into the party followed by Revolutionary Communist Organising Committee on 11 September 1979 and Dang District-based Sandesh Samuha.

The first national convention of the party was held between 26 December 1978 and 1 January 1979 where the ANCRCC (ML) formed the Communist Party of Nepal (Marxist–Leninist). The general convention also elected Chandra Prakash Mainali as the party's first general secretary of CPN (ML).

Mergers 
The party quickly emerged as the main communist faction in the country and several smaller communist factions merged with party. In July 1979 the Gandaki Province-based Marxist–Leninist Revolutionary Communist Party merged with the party. Revolutionary Communists in Arghakhanchi District, Marxist–Leninist Study Group and  Revolutionary Communist Organisation, Nepal joined the party in 1980. Communist Party of Nepal (Rebel Unity Centre) and Revolutionaries, a Parbat District-based splinter group of the Nepal Workers and Peasants Organisation joined the party in 1981.

The party had decided to boycott the 1980 Nepalese governmental system referendum which offered a choice between multi-party democracy and a reformed party-less panchayat system. The panchayat system was retained and the party leaders later openly regretted their boycott despite calls from within the party by K.P. Sharma Oli to participate in the referendum.

In 1982 a major shift took place. The party abandoned the strategy of armed struggle and opted for mass democratic struggles instead. Mainali was deposed as general secretary, and Jhala Nath Khanal took over the helm. In 1986 the process of reform of CPN (ML) accelerated further, with moderate Madan Bhandari elected general secretary. Barre Sangharsh Samuha and Nepal Workers and Peasants Organisation (D.P. Singh) also merged into the party by 1986.

After the declaration of multi-party democracy in the country, the CPN (ML) which had been functioning underground started working as an open political party. It tried to merge with other left factions in the country with certain success. In 1990 the party formed the United Left Front with other communist factions in the country. On 6 January 1991, before the 1991 general elections, CPN (ML) merged with the Communist Party of Nepal (Marxist) led by Man Mohan Adhikari to form Communist Party of Nepal (Unified Marxist–Leninist).

Ideology 
The ideology of the party was "New Democratic Revolution" whose success would eventually lead the country towards socialism and communism.  The party accepted Mao as the sole leader of the revolutionary movement. The "New Democratic Revolution" was based on the idea of agrarian revolution by uprooting the power of big landlords through armed struggle.

Leadership

General Secretaries of the CPN (Marxist–Leninist) 

 Chandra Prakash Mainali, 1978–82
 Jhala Nath Khanal, 1982–86
 Madan Kumar Bhandari, 1986–91

See also
 Communist Party of Nepal (Unified Marxist–Leninist)
K.P. Sharma Oli
Madhav Kumar Nepal

References

Defunct communist parties in Nepal
Rebel groups in Nepal
Political parties established in 1978
1978 establishments in Nepal
Political parties disestablished in 1991
1991 disestablishments in Nepal

fr:Parti communiste du Népal#Parti communiste du Népal (marxiste-léniniste)